Bajany (1370 Bajanhaza, 1439 Bayan, 1556 Rejdowa, 1786 Bonyesty, 1686 Resdowa) is a village and municipality in the Michalovce District in the Košice Region of Slovakia.

History
In historical records, the village was first mentioned in 1370. From 1939 to 1944 it belonged to Hungary.

Geography
The village lies at an altitude of 107 metres and covers an area of  (2020-06-30/-07-01).

Population 
It has a population of 452 people (2020-12-31).

Genealogical resources

The records for genealogical research are available at the state archive "Statny Archiv in Presov, Slovakia"

 Roman Catholic church records (births/marriages/deaths): 1869-1896
 Greek Catholic church records (births/marriages/deaths): 1792-1896
 Reformated church records (births/marriages/deaths): missing records 1800s (parish A)
 Census records 1869 of Bajany are available at the state archive.(UNG county...)

Gallery

See also
 List of municipalities and towns in Michalovce District
 List of municipalities and towns in Slovakia

References

External links

Statistics
Surnames of living people in Bajany

Villages and municipalities in Michalovce District